Veyron may refer to:
Bugatti Veyron, a supercar named after Pierre Veyron
Pierre Veyron, a Grand Prix motor racing driver active from 1933 until 1953
Chavannes-le-Veyron, a municipality in the district of Cossonay of the canton of Vaud, Switzerland
Veyron (river), a river in Switzerland
Juan Sebastián Verón, a misspelling of the surname of the Argentine footballer